The tenth series of the British medical drama television series Casualty commenced airing in the United Kingdom on BBC One on 16 September 1995 and finished on 24 February 1996. Notable events of the series include Ash's marriage to Laura, Baz's affair with Charlie, Baz's pregnancy, and a gas explosion.

Cast

Overview
The tenth series of Casualty features a cast of characters working in the emergency department of Holby City Hospital. The series began with 10 roles with star billing, which was a significant increase from the previous series. Clive Mantle starred as emergency medicine consultant Mike Barratt. Julia Watson appeared as specialist registrar Barbara "Baz" Hayes. Derek Thompson continued his role as charge nurse Charlie Fairhead while Sorcha Cusack portrayed senior staff nurse Kate Wilson. Patrick Robinson, Jane Gurnett and Lisa Coleman appeared as staff nurses Martin "Ash" Ashford, Rachel Longworth and Jude Korcanik. Ian Bleasdale and Sue Devaney starred as paramedics Josh Griffiths and Liz Harker. Jason Merrells portrayed receptionist Matt Hawley.

Craig Kelly and Lizzy McInnerny began portraying senior house officer Daniel Perryman and public relations officer Laura Milburn in episode one. Both left the roles at the conclusion of the series. Robert Duncan was introduced in episode two as the hospital's non-executive director Peter Hayes. Michael N. Harbour, Gary Bakewell and David Robb joined the recurring cast as security guard Trevor Wilson, porter Tim Greenway and surgeon Henry Reeve-Jones in episodes three, eleven and thirteen respectively. Blakewell departed in episode twenty-two while Robb departed in episode twenty-three. Frank Grimes reprised his guest role of Matt's father, Brian Hawley, for five episodes between episode nine and episode fifteen. Gurnett and Robinson chose to leave the show, with the former departing in episode twenty-one and the latter departing at the conclusion of the series.

Main characters 
Ian Bleasdale as Josh Griffiths
Lisa Coleman as Jude Korcanik
Sorcha Cusack as Kate Wilson
Sue Devaney as Liz Harker
Robert Duncan as Peter Hayes (episodes 2−20)
Jane Gurnett as Rachel Longworth (until episode 21)
Craig Kelly as Daniel Perryman (episodes 1−24)
Clive Mantle as Mike Barratt (until episode 21)
Lizzy McInnerny as Laura Milburn (episodes 1−24)
Jason Merrells as Matt Hawley
Patrick Robinson as Martin "Ash" Ashford (until episode 24)
Derek Thompson as Charlie Fairhead
Julia Watson as Barbara "Baz" Hayes

Recurring and guest characters 
Gary Bakewell as Tim Greenway (episodes 11−22)
Frank Grimes as Brian Hawley (episodes 9−15)
Michael N. Harbour as Trevor Wilson (from episode 3)
David Robb as Henry Reeve-Jones (episodes 13−23)
Letitia Dean as Hannah Chesney (episode 9)

Episodes

References

External links
Casualty series 10 at the Internet Movie Database

10
1995 British television seasons
1996 British television seasons